The Eyalet of Diyarbekir was an eyalet of the Ottoman Empire. In 1846 it was succeeded by the Kurdistan Eyalet.

Government
The 17th-century traveller Evliya Çelebi reported on the organization of the eyalet: "In this province there are nineteen sanjaks and five hakumets (or hereditary governments) [...] eight [sanjaks] were at the time of the conquest conferred on Kurdish begs with the patent of family inheritance for ever. Like other sanjaks they are divided into ziamets and timars, the possessors of which are obliged to serve in the field; but if they do not, the ziamet or timar may be transferred to a son or relation, but not to a stranger.

The hakumets have neither ziamets nor timars. Their governors exercise full authority, and receive not only the land revenues, but also all the other taxes which in the sanjaks are paid to the possessor of the ziamet or timar, such as the taxes for pasturage, marriages, horses, vineyards, and orchards. [...]

The officers of the divan of Diarbeker are the defterdar of the treasury with a ruz-namji (journal writer); a defterdar of the feudal forces an inspector (emin), and a lieutenant kehiya of the defter, and another for the chavushes; a secretary (katib), a colonel, and a lieutenant colonel of the militia".

History 
After Reşid Mehmet Pasha assumed as Wāli in 1834, he led military campaigns against the local Kurdish tribes of the Garzan, Bedir Khan and Milli as well as the Yazidi in Sinjar. In 1835 he also subdued the Milli tribe in Mardin  and in 1836, he defeated the ruler from the Emirate of Soran. After his death in 1836, his successor was Hafiz Mehmet Pasha who continued to subdue the Kurdish tribes and the Yazidi in Sincar. In the 1840s, the Eyalet ceded the Sanjak of Cizre, which before was part of the Emirate of Bohtan in the Diyarbekır Eyalet, to the Mosul Eyalet, which led to a Kurdish revolt led by Bedir Khan Beg.

Administrative divisions

See also
 Bedr Khan Beg
Emirate of Çemişgezek

References 

 
Eyalets of the Ottoman Empire in Anatolia
History of Batman Province
History of Diyarbakır Province
History of Elazığ Province
History of Malatya Province
History of Mardin Province
History of Siirt Province
History of Şanlıurfa Province
History of Tunceli Province
1515 establishments in the Ottoman Empire
1867 disestablishments in the Ottoman Empire